"Astronomy Domine" (alternative "Astronomy Dominé") is a song by the English rock band Pink Floyd. The song, written and composed by the original vocalist/guitarist Syd Barrett, is the opening track on their debut album, The Piper at the Gates of Dawn (1967). The lead vocal was sung by Barrett and the keyboard player Richard Wright. Its working title was "Astronomy Dominé (An Astral Chant)". "Domine" (the vocative of "Lord" in Latin) is a word frequently used in Gregorian chants.

Music

Sounds and references
The song was seen as Pink Floyd's first foray into space rock (along with "Interstellar Overdrive"), although band members later disparaged this term. The song opens with the voice of one of their managers at the time, Peter Jenner, reading the names of planets, stars and galaxies through a megaphone. A barely audible line, "Pluto was not discovered till 1930", can be heard in the megaphonic mix. Barrett's Fender Esquire emerges and grows louder. At 0:19, a rapid beeping sound is heard. At 0:26, Nick Mason's drum fills begin and Barrett plays the introductory figure. Keyboard player Richard Wright's Farfisa organ is mixed into the background. Barrett's lyrics about space support the theme in the song, mentioning the planets Jupiter, Saturn and Neptune as well as Uranian moons Oberon, Miranda and Titania, and Saturn's moon Titan. Barrett and Wright provide lead vocals. Roger Waters' bass guitar line, Wright's Farfisa organ and Barrett's slide guitar then dominate, with Jenner's megaphone recitation re-emerging from the mix for a time.

Music progression
The verse has an unusual chord progression, all in major chords: E, E♭, G and A. The chorus is entirely chromatic, descending directly from A to D on guitar, bass guitar and falsetto singing, down one semitone every three beats. In the introduction, Barrett takes an ordinary open E major chord and moves the fretted notes down one semitone, resulting in an E♭ major chord superimposed onto an open E minor chord, fretting E♭ and B♭ notes along with the open E, G, B and high-E strings of the guitar; the G functions both as major third to the E♭ chord and minor third to the E chord. In the live version heard on Ummagumma (1969), the post-Barrett band, with David Gilmour on guitar, normalised the introduction into straight E and E♭ major chords, also normalising the timing of the introduction, but,  in 1994, Gilmour began performing a version closer to the original (as heard on Pulse) that he carried into his solo career.

Barrett's Fender Esquire is played through a Binson echo machine, creating psychedelic delay effects. The track is the band's only overt "space rock" song, though a group-composed, abstract instrumental was titled "Interstellar Overdrive". Waters, in an interview with Nick Sedgewick, described "Astronomy Dominé" as "the sum total" of Barrett's writing about space, "yet there's this whole fucking mystique about how he was the father of it all".

Alternative and live versions
"Astronomy Domine" was a popular live piece, regularly included in the band's concerts. It is the first track on the live side of the album Ummagumma, released in 1969. This version reflects the band's more progressive style of that era. The song is extended by including the first verse twice, and the instrumental middle section, before becoming louder again by the last verse. The lead vocals are shared between Gilmour and Wright. While Wright sang the higher harmony in the studio version, Gilmour sang the higher harmony live. The Ummagumma live version can also be found replacing the studio version on the American release of A Nice Pair, a 1973 double album compiling the band's first two albums.

It was dropped from the live sets in mid-1971, but reappeared as the first song in some sets on the band's 1994 tour. The last time the song was performed with Waters was on 20 June 1971 at the Palaeur in Rome, Italy. A version from a concert in Miami appears as the B-side on the band's "Take It Back" single, and a version from one of the London concerts appears on the live album Pulse. Gilmour played the song at some of his appearances during his solo 2006 tour, again sharing the lead vocal with fellow Floyd member Wright. He said of playing the song live for the first time in over 20 years:

The track is also on the 2001 Pink Floyd compilation album, Echoes: The Best of Pink Floyd.

The Pulse version reverts to the original 4-minute length, with Gilmour and Wright taking lead vocals as in Ummagumma. This was the only song on the 1994 tour with Gilmour, Mason and Wright performing without backing musicians, with only Guy Pratt adding bass guitar and vocals.

The song was also played by Gilmour and his solo band (which included Wright with Pratt on bass guitar and Steve DiStanislao on drums) at the Abbey Road Studios sessions, which has been released as part of a CD/DVD On an Island package. "Astronomy Dominé" was performed during the last few dates of Gilmour's On an Island tour, and is on his Remember That Night and Live in Gdańsk DVDs.

Gilmour has also inserted the song in the setlist of his Rattle That Lock world tour.

The song was played by Nick Mason's Saucerful of Secrets in 2018.

Music video
In 1968, Pink Floyd travelled to Belgium and appeared on Tienerklanken where they filmed a lip-synced promotional film for "Astronomy Dominé", as well as "See Emily Play", "The Scarecrow", "Apples and Oranges", "Paint Box", "Set the Controls for the Heart of the Sun" and "Corporal Clegg". Barrett does not appear in these films, as he had been replaced by Gilmour who lip-synced Barrett's voice in the "Astronomy Dominé" video.

Personnel

The Piper at the Gates of Dawn version
Syd Barrett – lead and slide guitar (Fender Esquire), low vocals
Richard Wright – Farfisa organ, high vocals
Roger Waters – bass guitar (Rickenbacker 4001)
Nick Mason – drums
Peter Jenner – intro vocalisations

Ummagumma live version
David Gilmour – guitar, high vocals
Richard Wright – Farfisa organ, low vocals
Roger Waters – bass guitar, backing vocals
Nick Mason – drums

Pulse live version
David Gilmour – guitar, vocals
Richard Wright – keyboards, vocals
Nick Mason – drums

with:
Guy Pratt – bass guitar, vocals

Live in Gdańsk live version
David Gilmour – guitar, vocals
Richard Wright – keyboards, vocals
Jon Carin – keyboards, vocals
Steve DiStanislao – drums
Phil Manzanera – guitar
Guy Pratt – bass guitar, vocals

Cultural references

 The album The Dark Side of the Moog X (2005) by Klaus Schulze and Pete Namlook is subtitled "Astro Know Me Domina".
 The Canadian heavy metal band Voivod covered "Astronomy Dominé" on their 1989 album Nothingface.
 The Brazilian band Violeta de Outono covered the song on their live album Seventh Brings Return: A Tribute to Syd Barrett (2009).
 The song was covered by The Claypool Lennon Delirium on their EP Lime and Limpid Green (2017).

Notes

References

External links

 1970 performance, from KQED 
[ AMG song review]

Pink Floyd songs
1967 songs
Songs written by Syd Barrett
Songs about outer space